New Hope Presbyterian Church is a historic church located near Winnabow, Brunswick County, North Carolina.  It was built in 1895, and is a one-story, frame church building with a Queen Anne style exterior and Gothic Revival interior.  It features a steeply-pitched, gable-front roof and rests on a brick pier foundation. A fellowship hall was added about 1941. Also on the property is a contributing church cemetery.

It was added to the National Register of Historic Places in 2011.

References

Presbyterian churches in North Carolina
19th-century Presbyterian church buildings in the United States
Churches on the National Register of Historic Places in North Carolina
Carpenter Gothic church buildings in North Carolina
Queen Anne architecture in North Carolina
Churches completed in 1895
Buildings and structures in Brunswick County, North Carolina
National Register of Historic Places in Brunswick County, North Carolina